The following is a list of the oldest hospitals in the United States, containing extant hospitals in the United States established prior to the year 1900. The dates refer to the foundation or the earliest documented contemporary reference to the hospital.

Hospitals

Eighteenth century

Nineteenth century

See also
History of medicine in the United States

References

Oldest
History of medicine in the United States